Lidgetton is a town in uMngeni Local Municipality in the KwaZulu-Natal province of South Africa.

References

Populated places in the uMngeni Local Municipality